Luke Jacob Travers (born 3 September 2001) is an Australian professional basketball player for the Perth Wildcats of the National Basketball League (NBL). Opting to forgo college basketball in the United States to begin his professional career in Australia, he made his debut for the Wildcats as a development player in 2019 and became an NBL champion in 2020. At state league level, he played three seasons for the Rockingham Flames in the State Basketball League (SBL) between 2017 and 2019, and then had a stint with the Cockburn Cougars in 2020 during the West Coast Classic. He was selected by the Cleveland Cavaliers with the 56th overall pick in the 2022 NBA draft.

Early life and career
Travers was born in the Perth southern suburb of Rockingham. He attended Port Kennedy Primary School and Willetton Senior High School. He played basketball for the Rockingham Flames as a junior and was childhood friends with AFL player Luke Jackson.

Travers made his senior debut for the Rockingham Flames in the State Basketball League (SBL) in 2017. He saw action in five games and totaled five points. In 2018, he played five games during the regular season and then all five games during the finals, helping the Flames sweep the Geraldton Buccaneers 2–0 in the quarter-finals and averaging 14.7 points during the 2–1 semi-final series loss to the Perry Lakes Hawks. That year, he was named Male WABL Player of the Year. In 2019, he played 18 games for the Flames and averaged 11.7 points, 5.2 rebounds and 2.3 assists per game. He was an integral player for the Flames in 2019, starting a number of games but often used as the sixth man off the bench. He was subsequently named the SBL Most Improved Player.

In 2018, Travers helped break a 17-year drought for Western Australia, winning gold at the Under 18 National Championships.

Professional career

Perth Wildcats (2019–present)

2019–20 season
On 1 August 2019, Travers signed with the Perth Wildcats as a development player for the 2019–20 NBL season. His elite athleticism and ability to play multiple positions made him an attractive option for the Wildcats. Regarded as one of Australia's most sought-after basketball prospects, he had interest from a number of colleges in the United States, but indicated his desire to turn professional due to a lack of motivation at school. In his debut for the Wildcats on 1 December 2019, he had three points, four assists and two rebounds in roughly 11 minutes in a 99–88 loss to the Adelaide 36ers. On 20 December 2019, he opted to forgo college basketball and begin his professional career, signing a three-year contract extension with the Wildcats. He played four games during the season and was a member of the Wildcats' championship-winning squad in March 2020.

During the West Coast Classic in 2020, Travers had a five-game stint with the Cockburn Cougars, averaging 17.8 points, 14.4 rebounds, 5.2 assists, 2.2 steals and 1.2 blocks per game.

2020–21 season
Continuing on as a development player in the 2020–21 NBL season, Travers was thrust into a much larger role during the preseason, starting in both of the Wildcats' preseason games against the Illawarra Hawks. While mostly a traditional wing player, he added strength to his frame over the off-season and was assigned the starting power forward role. He was replaced in the starting line-up by Jarred Bairstow midway through the season, with Travers later stating he got complacent in the role and was forced to work his way back into starting contention. On 28 March 2021, he went 6-of-6 from the field for 16 points off the bench in an 89–65 win over the Sydney Kings. A season-ending injury to Bryce Cotton saw Travers return to the starting line-up as a guard at the back-end of the regular season and in the semi-finals. On 27 May, he had 16 points and eight rebounds in an 81–67 win over the Kings. In the 2–1 semi-final series win over Illawarra, Travers averaged 10.7 points, 7.3 rebounds and three assists per game. He went on to miss the first two games of the grand final series against Melbourne United with a calf injury, returning in game three to record nine points and six rebounds off the bench in an 81–76 series-ending loss.

On 1 July 2021, Travers signed with the Mandurah Magic for the rest of the 2021 NBL1 West season. However, he was never cleared by the Wildcats medical staff to play for Mandurah.

2021–22 season
Travers entered the 2021–22 NBL season as a fully contracted player and earned the rank of number 83 in ESPN's top 100 NBA draft rankings. On 5 December 2021, he had a career-high 14 rebounds in the Wildcats' 90–67 win over the Cairns Taipans. On 5 February 2022, he scored a career-high 24 points in a 101–79 win over the South East Melbourne Phoenix. He averaged 7.8 points, 5.4 rebounds, 2.3 assists, 0.8 steals and 0.7 blocks per game during the 2021–22 season, playing both inside and outside roles while also periodically running the offense.

2022 NBA draft and Summer League
On 24 April 2022, Travers declared for the 2022 NBA draft. He was selected by the Cleveland Cavaliers with the 56th overall pick. He joined the Cavaliers for the 2022 NBA Summer League, where he averaged 6.6 points, 4.6 rebounds, 1.8 assists, 1.2 steals and 1.2 blocks in five games.

2022–23 season
Travers re-joined the Wildcats for the 2022–23 NBL season. He helped the Wildcats return to the finals by recording 22 points, 11 rebounds and six assists in the regular-season finale against the Sydney Kings.

National team career
In 2018, Travers represented Australia at the Under-17 FIBA World Cup in Argentina and won gold at the Under-16 FIBA Asia Championship in China. He had 22 points, eight rebounds, three assists, four steals and two blocks for Australia in their title-clinching victory over China and was named in the all-tournament second team.

In August 2022, Travers made his Australian Boomers debut during the World Cup qualifiers.

Personal life
Travers is the son of Karl and Sam. He has an older brother and a sister.

References

External links

NBL profile
FIBA profile
"Wildcats to grow legacy of Number 4" at wildcats.com.au
"Draft rankings snub 'fuel to the fire' for Travers" at nbl.com.au

2001 births
Living people
Australian men's basketball players
Basketball players from Perth, Western Australia
Cleveland Cavaliers draft picks
Forwards (basketball)
Guards (basketball)
Perth Wildcats players